The Doña Ana Village Historic District, in Doña Ana, New Mexico, is a historic district which was listed on the National Register of Historic Places in 1996.

It is roughly bounded by the Doña Ana lateral irrigation ditch, Interstate 25, New Mexico State Road 320, and Doña Ana School Rd.

The town, founded in 1843, is the oldest permanent settlement in southern New Mexico;  numerous earlier settlements did not survive.

The district includes:
Nuestra Senora de la Purificacion Church, which is separately listed on the National Register
Maximjano Garcia House (late 1800s)
more

References

Historic districts on the National Register of Historic Places in New Mexico
National Register of Historic Places in Doña Ana County, New Mexico